Mallory Diane Swanson (born April 29, 1998) is an American soccer player who plays as a forward for the Chicago Red Stars of the National Women's Soccer League (NWSL), the highest division of women's professional soccer in the United States, and the United States women's national soccer team (USWNT). She is the youngest player in USWNT history to reach 10 career assists, she holds the record for most assists in USWNT history before the age of 20, and in January 2016 at age 17 she was the youngest in USWNT history to be selected and play in an Olympic qualifying tournament.

After playing extensively with the U–17 and U–20 teams, Swanson first appeared for the USWNT on January 23, 2016 in an international friendly against Ireland. At 17, she was the youngest player to debut for the national team since Heather O'Reilly in 2002. Swanson scored in the 83rd minute in her first appearance, becoming the 19th USWNT player to score in her debut. That same year Swanson was part of the 18 player roster representing the United States at the 2016 Summer Olympics in Rio de Janeiro, Brazil. It was there that Swanson scored her first Olympic goal against Colombia, giving the United States a 2–1 lead. Her goal also made her the youngest player to ever score a goal for the United States in an Olympic game. Swanson has represented the United States at the FIFA Women's World Cup tournament in 2019. At 21, she was the second youngest member of the 2019 team behind 20-year-old Tierna Davidson.

On April 17, 2017, Swanson announced she would forgo her college career with UCLA after one quarter and turn professional. She later signed with the Washington Spirit in May 2017 where she stayed for three seasons, before playing at Sky Blue FC and currently at the Chicago Red Stars.

Early life
Born in Littleton, Colorado to Karen and Horace Pugh, Swanson was raised with her older sister Brianna in Highlands Ranch, Colorado. Her mother was a long-distance runner and her father ran track and played football. Growing up, Swanson considered her older sister Brianna a role model and cites her as a reason she got started in soccer. She started playing soccer at the age of four and then followed in her sister's footsteps and played club soccer with Real Colorado in the Elite Clubs National League. She played on the competitive team with the club at the U-11 through U-18 levels; although she started playing recreational soccer at the U-5 level. During her last two years with the team, she often trained with the club's Boys Development Academy team. Swanson helped Real Colorado win state titles in 2010 and 2011. In addition, the team made it to the Elite Clubs National League finals in both 2013 and 2014. At the U-16 level, Real Colorado won state and regional titles and became runner-up at nationals. Swanson was named the MVP of the regional tournament that year.

Swanson attended Mountain Vista High School in Highlands Ranch from 2012 to 2016. In her three seasons with the team, Swanson scored 47 goals and recorded 23 assists. As a freshman, Swanson was named to the All-Colorado Team after leading her team to a state title. She was named offensive MVP at Mountain Vista and a NSCAA Youth All-American for 2013. During her sophomore year, despite missing more than half of her high school games due to national team commitments, she helped the team to the state semifinals. As a junior, Swanson scored 24 goals and 12 assists in 18 games and helped the team reach the state semifinals. She was subsequently named the 2014–15 Gatorade National Girls Soccer Player of the Year and Colorado Sports Hall of Fame 2015 High School Female Athlete of the Year. In addition, she was named NSCAA Youth Girls National Player of the Year for 2014 and 2015.

In January 2016, it was reported that Swanson had turned down college in order to turn professional and play for National Women's Soccer League club Portland Thorns FC when she finished high school. Later that week, her father said the reports were false and that Swanson would join the UCLA soccer team as originally planned. In July 2016, it was announced she delayed entrance to UCLA until January 2017, due to national team commitments for the Rio Olympics and the 2016 FIFA U–20 Women's World Cup. She appeared in three non-competitive spring scrimmages in early 2017 before departing UCLA prior to starting her freshman season to pursue a professional career.

Club career

Washington Spirit (2017–2019)
After much speculation as to where she would go when she turned pro, Swanson officially joined the Washington Spirit of the NWSL on May 13, 2017. She made her professional debut for the Spirit on May 20, 2017 versus FC Kansas City. Swanson scored 6 goals in her rookie season and was named a finalist for NWSL Rookie of the Year.

Swanson remained with the Spirit for the 2018 season. She sustained a PCL sprain in her right knee on May 27, forcing her to miss 8 games, she returned to the field on August 5, against the Seattle Reign.

Sky Blue FC (2020)
On January 16, 2020, at the NWSL College Draft, Swanson was traded to Sky Blue FC for 4 draft picks. She made her Sky Blue debut on September 5, 2020 against the Washington Spirit, entering the game in the 61st minute. Sky Blue won 2–1, Swanson assisting Margaret Purce on the game winning goal in extra time.

Chicago Red Stars (2021–present)
In December 2020, Swanson was traded to the Chicago Red Stars, along with Sarah Woldmoe in exchange for the fourth and eighth overall draft picks in 2021, a conditional first round draft pick in 2022, and an international roster spot for 2021–2022. Swanson made her debut in the 2021 NWSL Challenge Cup, starting the team's game against Kansas City. In 2021, Swanson was voted in second place for the most valuable player in the NWSL behind Jess Fishlock from OL Reign.

Club statistics

International career

Youth National Teams
In 2011, Swanson attended the annual United States under–14 girl's national team identification camp from July 13 to August 7 in Portland, Oregon. The camp was used as an evaluation for U–14 training camp held in September. Swanson was then called into the U–14 national team training camp at Home Depot Center in Carson, California from September 18 to 25. In 2012, Swanson attended a U–15 national team training camp from February 11 to 18. She then joined the team for a second training camp from June 3 to 10 at The Home Depot Center. Also during the summer, the U–14 national team conducted three separate training camps to replace the large identification camp of previous years. Swanson attended the second camp, which ran from August 12 to 19.

U-17 WNT
In 2013, Swanson attended a U–15 national team training camp from February 24 to March 2 at the Olympic Training Center in Chula Vista, California. She then moved up to the U–17 national team and traveled to San José, Costa Rica for an international tournament in late April. Following the tournament, Swanson joined the U–17 team for a training camp from June 9 to 16. In preparation for the 2013 CONCACAF Women's U–17 Championship, Swanson attended another U–17 training camp from July 21 to 31 in Columbus, Ohio as well as a camp in Lakewood Ranch, Florida from September 15 to 22.

In late September 2013, Swanson was named to the roster for the 2013 CONCACAF U–17 Women's Championship held in Jamaica from October 30 to November 9. Before heading to Jamaica, the team trained together once again in Lakewood Ranch for seven days. During the tournament, Swanson was a key player and leading scorer with five goals and three assists. In the semifinal match against Mexico on November 7, the United States fell in penalties after a 1–1 tie in regulation. With a third-place finish in the tournament, the United States did not qualify to the 2014 FIFA U–17 Women's World Cup.

Swanson remained with the U–17 national team for a short time in 2014. She started off the year with the team at a training camp from January 11 to 19 in Carson, California. The camp served as a preparation for an international tournament held in February. Swanson was on the roster for the tournament, which was held at the U.S. National Team Training Center in Carson. In their final match of the tournament on February 9, the United States faced Japan. During the game, Swanson scored her fourth goal of the tournament to help the United States pull away the 2–1 victory and win the tournament title.

U-20 WNT
At the end of her time with the U–17 national team, Swanson was called up to the U–20 national team for a training camp from February 22 to March 2 that also featured a match against China. Swanson was then on a 25–player roster for a U–20 training camp from April 13 to 20. In preparation for the 2014 FIFA U–20 Women's World Cup in August, the U–20 team also trained in May and July, with a trip to Europe in June. After the team's final camp from July 9 to 23, Swanson was named to the roster for the 2014 FIFA U–20 Women's World Cup. At 16, she was the youngest member of the team. Swanson played all 90 minutes of the team's first match of the tournament against Germany on August 5. In the team's second group match against Brazil on August 8, Swanson suffered a right ankle injury in the 27th minute and was replaced by Taylor Racioppi. Despite the injury, Swanson went on to start the remaining two matches of the tournament. The United States team fell to Korea DPR on August 16, which halted their advancement in the tournament.

Swanson started off 2015 at a U–20 national team training camp in Sanford, Florida from January 24 to 31. The training camp featured a match against German club Bayern Munich. Swanson started in that match; however, the U–20 team was defeated 4–0. Following the training camp, Swanson was named to the 22–player roster for an invitational tournament in La Manga, Spain. In the first match of the tournament, Swanson scored both goals of the game to help the United States defeat Norway. Swanson wore the captain's armband during the team's second match against the Netherlands on March 7. Swanson played all 90 minutes in the team's last match against Sweden on March 9.

In November 2015, Swanson was named to the roster for the 2015 CONCACAF Women's U–20 Championship in December. Swanson was the most experienced player on the roster and also captained the team. In the first match against Mexico on December 4, Swanson scored on a penalty kick in the 20th minute. The United States qualified for the 2016 FIFA U-20 Women's World Cup after defeating Honduras in the semifinal on December 11. Swanson helped the team win the tournament with a 1–0 win over Canada on December 13. Following the tournament, Swanson was awarded the Golden Boot for most goals scored and the Golden Ball for best player of the tournament. On December 18, Swanson was named the 2015 U.S. Soccer Young Female Player of the Year.

Despite being a member of the senior national team in 2016, Swanson at age 18 was still comfortably age eligible for the 2016 FIFA U-20 Women's World Cup. After returning from the Olympics, Swanson joined the U-20 team at a training camp on September 1, 2016. Swanson captained the U-20 United States team at the 2016 FIFA U-20 Women's World Cup where she was the most experienced player on their team with 23 international matches and 17 goals. In the second group stage game against New Zealand the United States won 3–1, Swanson scoring and receiving player of the match honors.

By participating in the 2016 FIFA U-20 Women's World Cup and the 2016 Summer Olympics, Swanson made history by being the first United States women's player to play in both tournaments in the same year. Swanson would still be age eligible for the 2018 FIFA U-20 Women's World Cup.

Senior National Team

2016

Following a successful run with the U-20 women's national team, Swanson was called up to the senior national team for the first training camp of 2016 from January 5 to 21 leading up to a match against Ireland. At age 17, she was one of the youngest field players to be called up to the team in 15 years. On January 23, 2016, Swanson earned her first cap for the USWNT during the match against Ireland, coming in for Alex Morgan in the 58th minute. She was the youngest player to debut for the national team since Heather O'Reilly's debut in 2002. She then became the 19th United States player to score in her debut when she scored her first international goal in the 83rd minute to secure the United States' 5–0 win.

Following her first appearance, Swanson was named to the 20–player roster for 2016 CONCACAF Women's Olympic Qualifying and became the youngest player to be named to an Olympic qualifying roster for the USWNT. In the team's opening match against Costa Rica on February 10, Swanson replaced Crystal Dunn in the 68th minute. She made her third appearance for the team in their second match of the tournament, coming in for Ali Krieger in the 75th minute to help the USWNT defeat Mexico 1–0. Swanson made her first start in the team's match against Puerto Rico on February 15. During the match, she recorded an assist in the 6th minute. In the 18th minute, Puerto Rico player Selimar Pagan took down Swanson in the penalty box and the USWNT was given a penalty kick, which Carli Lloyd scored. In the 60th minute, Swanson sent a cross towards Alex Morgan, but it was deflected off Puerto Rican defender Ashley Rivera and into her own net. Swanson started in the semifinal match against Trinidad and Tobago on February 19, helping the USWNT qualify to the 2016 Olympic Games in Rio de Janeiro after a 5–0 victory. Swanson also made the start in the final against Canada, helping the USWNT win the tournament after defeating Canada 2–0.

Swanson was named to the roster for the 2016 SheBelieves Cup that took place from March 3 to 9. She started in the team's opening match of the tournament on March 3 against England. In the match against France on March 6, Swanson assisted the only goal of the match in stoppage time, giving the USWNT the win. She also made an appearance in the final match of the tournament against Germany and the USWNT won the 2016 SheBelieves Cup with a 2–1 win.

Swanson joined a 23–player roster for a training camp ahead of two matches against Colombia in early April. On April 6, Swanson scored her second international goal off an assist by Carli Lloyd in the team's first match against Colombia. She then assisted Lloyd's goal six minutes later. She played all 90 minutes in the second match against Colombia on April 10. When Swanson turned 18 on 29 April 2016 she had added her name to a list of records, including fifth all-time for most USWNT caps before the age of 18 with 11, third for most goals before the age of 18 with two, fourth in most starts before the age of 18 with seven, and first for most assists before the age of 18 with five.

Swanson was on the roster for a short training camp ahead of another two–game series against Japan in early June. She played all 90 minutes of the first match on June 2 in Commerce City, Colorado and made an assist in the 27th minute. Swanson did not dress for the second match on June 5 due to illness.

2016 Summer Olympics
On July 12, 2016, Swanson was named to the 18–player team that would represent the United States at the 2016 Olympic Games in Rio de Janeiro. She made her Olympic debut on August 3 in the team's opening group match against New Zealand. On August 9, Swanson came in for Megan Rapinoe in the 33rd minute of the team's final group match against Colombia. She scored in the 59th minute, becoming the youngest United States player to score a goal in the Olympics. She put the United States ahead 2–1 with her goal; however, the match ended in a 2–2 draw. In the quarterfinals, Swanson started in the match against Sweden on August 12. The game was tied 1–1 after regulation time and Swanson was replaced by Lindsey Horan in the 114th minute in extra time. The United States were then defeated by Sweden in penalty kicks.

2017
Across the 16 games played by the USWNT in 2017, Swanson played in 12 and started in 9 of them. She was named to the roster for the 2017 SheBelieves Cup. After turning 19 on April 29, 2017, Swanson's records for the USWNT were tied with Mia Hamm for third in USWNT history for goals before age of 19 with four, fourth in caps with 22, and second in starts with 15. In October Swanson sustained a hamstring injury during a match against the South Korean national team when the USWNT was winning 3–1.

2018
Swanson started 2018 off strong with her first career brace on January 21, 2018 against Denmark, the USWNT winning the game 5–1. In her last game as a teenager on April 8, 2018 against Mexico she scored her fifth goal of the calendar year. For her teenage national team stats, Swanson was second all-time in starts before the age of 20 with 27, second all-time in caps before the age of 20 with 35, tied third all-time in goals before the age of 20 with 11, and first all-time in assists before the age of 20 with 12.

On June 8, 2018, Swanson injured her PCL in her right knee. She made her comeback on August 31, 2018 in a game against Chile. The United States won 3–0, Swanson assisting the third goal scored by Christen Press who was being honored that game for 100 national team caps.

2019
Swanson scored the first goal of the year for the United States in a 3–1 loss against France played at Le Havre. She played in the 2019 SheBelieves Cup where the United States finished as runners up. On April 4, Swanson scored her second career brace in a match against Australia, the United States winning 5–3. Her first goal in that game came just 37 seconds after she had subbed onto the pitch in the 67th minute. Swanson also scored against Mexico in the final send off series game for the United States before the 2019 FIFA Women's World Cup.

2019 FIFA Women's World Cup
Swanson was one of 23 players called up for the 2019 FIFA Women's World Cup. At 21 she was the second youngest player on the roster behind 20 year old Tierna Davidson. The USWNT played their first game on 11 June 2019 against Thailand, winning by a historic 13–0 margin. Swanson subbed on in the 69th minute, assisting Megan Rapinoe's goal in the 74th minute and later scoring her first FIFA Women's World Cup goal in the 85th minute. She was 21 years and 43 days old when she scored, making her the third youngest USWNT player in history to score at the FIFA Women's World Cup. She appeared in all three group stage games against Thailand, Chile and Sweden. The USWNT went on to win the 2019 FIFA Women's World Cup.

2020
Swanson was named to the roster for the 2020 SheBelieves Cup, marking her fifth appearance at the tournament. In their third and final game of the tournament against Japan, the United States won 3–1, Swanson assisting a goal scored by Lindsey Horan. After the USWNT had a break in international playing due to COVID-19, Swanson was unavailable to participate in the national team camp being held from October 18–28, 2020 due to injury.

2021
Swanson began the year attending the annual January camp for the United States. However, injury and inconsistent play meant she did not see the field for the United States until later that year, in a series of friendlies in September and October versus Paraguay and the South Korean national team. Swanson's return to play was strong, notching three assists in the first game against Paraguay, the most for any United States player in one game since Alex Morgan in the 2019 FIFA Women's World Cup.

2022
Swanson saw a return to normalcy in 2022, playing in 15 of the United States' 18 games and starting 13 of them. She was named to the roster for the United States in the 2022 SheBelieves Cup and finished as the leading goal scorer of the tournament, hitting the back of the net once versus New Zealand and twice versus Iceland. As the year went on, Swanson continued to break records, both those of the United States' and her own. Her goal against Uzbekistan on April 12 marked a four-match scoring streak, overtaking the record from 2021 previously held by Megan Rapinoe. During the 2022 CONCACAF W Championship, Swanson played in her 75th national team cap for the United States, the 49th player to do so and the youngest since Heather O'Reilly in 2008. She had 14 goal involvements, 7 goals and a team-high 7 assists – her career best.

2023 
Swanson continued her strong form in early 2023, scoring three times in a pair of friendly games against New Zealand and another three times at the 2023 SheBelieves Cup. This meant she scored in five consecutive USWNT games, a personal best.

Personal life
Swanson is a Christian. In December 2017, she started dating MLB shortstop Dansby Swanson after meeting him through her brother-in-law and Swanson's former teammate Jace Peterson. The couple got engaged in December 2021 and married on December 10, 2022. She began using her married name in 2023.

In popular culture

Media and Endorsements
In May 2017, Nike announced it had signed a long-term partnership with Swanson, describing her as a "soccer phenom." She has since appeared in multiple promotions and advertisements with Nike, including the Dream With Us ad as part of the Just Do It campaign.

In 2019 Swanson appeared in two promotions for Gatorade, one titled Bring the Heat which featured Lionel Messi and the other titled Every Day is Your Day which featured Mia Hamm.

Swanson is part of the FIFA video game series, FIFA 21. She was selected as a next-generation ambassador in the video game.

Ticker tape parade
After winning the 2019 FIFA Women's World Cup, Swanson and the rest of the United States national team were honored in New York City with a ticker tape parade, each team member also receiving a key to the city.

Player statistics

International summary

International goals

World Cup and Olympic Appearances

Honors
United States
 FIFA Women's World Cup: 2019
 CONCACAF Women's Championship: 2018;  2022
 SheBelieves Cup: 2016; 2018; 2020; 2022; 2023
Individual
 U.S. Soccer Young Female Athlete of the Year: 2015
 Gatorade National Female Soccer Player of the Year: 2016
 National Soccer Coaches Association of America (NSCAA) Youth Girls National Player of the Year: 2014
 NSCAA Youth All–America Team: 2013
 Sports Illustrated Sports Kid of the Year Top 5 Finalist: 2012
 NWSL Best XI: 2022
 SheBelieves Cup Top scorer: 2023

References

 Match reports

Further reading
 Grainey, Timothy (2012), Beyond Bend It Like Beckham: The Global Phenomenon of Women's Soccer, University of Nebraska Press, 
 Lisi, Clemente A. (2010), The U.S. Women's Soccer Team: An American Success Story, Scarecrow Press, 
 Nash, Tim (2016), It's Not the Glory: The Remarkable First Thirty Years of US Women's Soccer, Lulu Publishing Services, 
 Stewart, Barbara (2012), Women's Soccer: The Passionate Game, Greystone Books Ltd,

External links

 
 US Soccer player profile
 ECNL player profile
 

1998 births
Living people
American women's soccer players
Soccer players from Colorado
Sportspeople from the Denver metropolitan area
United States women's international soccer players
Women's association football forwards
Footballers at the 2016 Summer Olympics
Olympic soccer players of the United States
People from Highlands Ranch, Colorado
United States women's under-20 international soccer players
Washington Spirit players
National Women's Soccer League players
African-American women's soccer players
2019 FIFA Women's World Cup players
FIFA Women's World Cup-winning players
Chicago Red Stars players
21st-century African-American sportspeople
21st-century African-American women